David McFetteridge was a Scottish footballer who played as a forward for Cowlairs, Bolton Wanderers, Derby County and Newton Heath.

External links
MUFCInfo.com profile

Scottish footballers
Manchester United F.C. players
Bolton Wanderers F.C. players
Derby County F.C. players
Cowlairs F.C. players
Year of birth missing
Association football forwards